Gymnocalycium bayrianum is a species of Gymnocalycium from Argentina.

References

External links
 
 

bayrianum
Flora of Argentina